Laudio/Llodio is a town and municipality located in the province of Álava, in the Basque Country, northern Spain. Laudio is the name in Basque language and Llodio in Spanish; both are used indistinctly.

Geography and Demography

Llodio is an important industrial center located at 50 km NW from the provincial capital of Vitoria and at 20 km SE from Bilbao. It is the second municipality of Álava, in population. The municipality has an area of 37,56 km² and a population (2005) of 18,633 (9,288 male, 9,345 female).

Its geographical coordinates are:

 Latitude:	43º09’4’’ N	
 Longitude:	2º57’22’’ W		
 Altitude:	Minimum: 130 m, Maximum: 782 m.

Elections and local administration

Municipal election

Since the 2019 Municipal elections the Mayor of Llodio is Mr. Ander Añibarro Maestre (PNV). The Basque Nationalist Party PNV/EAJ has 7 municipal councillors on Llodio Town Council, Bildu has 5, the local group Omnia has 3 while the Socialist Party of the Basque Country–Basque Country Left has 2.

General election

The results of the 2004 Spanish General Election in Llodio were as follows:

 PNV  -	Partido Nacionalista Vasco: 37.9%
 PSE-EE (PSOE - EE) Partido Socialista de Euskadi: 	27.8%
 PP -	Partido Popular:	18.6%
 EB-IU  -	Izquierda Unida:	6.9%
 EA  -	Eusko Alkartasuna:	4.8%
 ARALAR-ZUTI  -	Aralar-Zutik:	2.0%

Sport

The town has a local athletics club, Club de Atletismo de Laudio, which has its own track and field stadium (the Estadio Ellakuri). The club has hosted the Cross Internacional Valle de Llodio, an annual international cross country running event, since 1985.

References

External links
 City Council Website 
 LLODIO in the Bernardo Estornés Lasa - Auñamendi Encyclopedia (Euskomedia Fundazioa) 
 Aerial view of Llodio (Google maps)

Municipalities in Álava